Holmes Mills may refer to:

Holmes Mill, Kentucky
Homes Mills, New Jersey, also known as Holmes Mills